D. carbonaria  may refer to:
 Dactylolabis carbonaria, a crane fly species in the genus Dactylolabis
 Diglossa carbonaria, the grey-bellied flowerpiercer, a bird species found in Argentina and Bolivia
 Drosophila carbonaria, a fly species in the genus Drosophila

See also
 Carbonaria (disambiguation)